William J. (Bill) Hornbuckle IV is CEO and President of MGM Resorts International, headquartered in Paradise, Nevada.

Early years
Hornbuckle was born on a U.S. Air Force Base in Japan. He grew up in Connecticut. To pursue a career in the hospitality industry, he moved to Las Vegas where he earned a Bachelor of Science Degree in Hotel Administration at the University of Nevada Las Vegas. Hornbuckle has more than 30 years of experience working in Las Vegas which led to his current position for MGM Resorts International, one of the biggest companies in the hospitality and entertainment industry.

Career
Bill Hornbuckle discovered his interest in hospitality at age 18 while working as a bartender in Connecticut. After learning about the "hotel school" at UNLV, he drove across the country in a van with his friends to pursue a hospitality career. He started his career in Las Vegas as a room service attendant and busboy at the Jockey Club before being promoted to his first managerial role as an assistant hotel manager at the then Flamingo Hilton.  

Hornbuckle went on to work at a variety of Las Vegas resorts before joining MGM. For many years he worked at the Golden Nugget. He was also on the opening team of The Mirage, which at the time was one of the world's largest hotels and Las Vegas' first integrated resort. As President and CEO, Hornbuckle also oversaw the $625 million refurbishment of Caesers Palace, one of the most notable properties on the Las Vegas strip.

Hornbuckle joined the MGM Resorts International team in 1998 as Executive Vice President of Operations at the MGM Grand Las Vegas, and half a year later he became President and Chief Operating Officer at the same property. He held that role until 2001. Throughout his two decades with MGM, he has served in a number of roles including President and Chief Operating Officer of Mandalay Bay Resort & Casino, President of Design and Development and MGM Resorts' Chief Marketing Officer. Under his leadership in that capacity, MGM Resorts created and launched its customer loyalty program, M Life Rewards. The program was later enhanced and became MGM Rewards to allow both gaming and non-gaming guests to earn credits towards rewards, including dining, entertainment, travel and hotel stays.

In 2012, Hornbuckle was appointed President of MGM Resorts International, and in 2019 he became Chief Operating Officer and President of MGM Resorts International. In these roles he led the development of MGM Resorts in National Harbor, Springfield, Macau, and the T-Mobile Arena in Las Vegas.

Hornbuckle was appointed as Acting CEO in March 2020, immediately after the COVID-19 pandemic began. He immediately faced numerous challenges and led the company through the closure of operations, restricted re-openings and implementation of new health and safety measures. He was named CEO and President on July 29, 2020. He assumed this role from Jim Murren, who was Chairman & CEO from 2008 to 2020. 

Hornbuckle has played a key role in expanding MGM Resorts' and Las Vegas' hotel, entertainment and sports betting attractions. In 2016, Hornbuckle was appointed by Gov. Brian Sandoval to serve on the Clark County Stadium Authority Board, which developed the Las Vegas NFL Stadium Project as part of a successful effort to attract an NFL team, the Raiders, to Las Vegas. He also played a key role in bringing the WNBA team, the Aces, to Las Vegas in 2017. He served as President of T-Mobile Arena, which became home to Las Vegas' first professional sports team, the NHL's Golden Knights.

Hornbuckle is leading MGM's expansion into Japan. The company was selected as the Osaka region's integrated resort partner for a $10 billion development that will be one of Japan's first integrated resorts. He is also leading MGM's expansion into iGaming and sports betting. BetMGM, the company's online gaming platform, is currently active in many jurisdictions where the activity is legal, and Hornbuckle is leading the company to invest in the continued growth of BetMGM and other global digital markets.

He also serves as a board member of MGM Resorts International and as Chairman of MGM Grand Paradise SA.

Education
Hornbuckle is a graduate of the University of Nevada, Las Vegas (UNLV) and has a Bachelor of Science degree in Hotel Administration.

Awards, community and industry involvement
Throughout his career, Hornbuckle has been active in supporting community, industry and charitable organizations.  Bill Hornbuckle serves as Chair of the U.S. Travel and Tourism Advisory Board, which advises the U.S. Secretary of Commerce on policy, regulation, programs and issues that impact the travel and tourism industry in the United States. He received the Hospitality College's 2019 Industry Leader of the Year Award and was named among Global Gaming Business Magazine's 25 People to Watch List in 2021.

He grew up with modest means and attended Catholic school, where, unbeknownst to him, he was provided free tuition out of the school's generosity. This drives his interest in supporting education. He serves on the board of the Fulfillment Fund, which supports first-generation college students in removing barriers to access. In 2004, Hornbuckle and his wife created an endowed scholarship fund to provide financial support to Nevada-based students pursuing hospitality degrees at UNLV. In 2016, they established the William Hornbuckle Family Endowment Scholarship Fund at The Webb Schools in Claremont, California, where he currently serves as a Board Trustee.

Bill Hornbuckle was a founder of GBank (formerly know as Bank of George), a local bank that offers financial services to the Las Vegas community. He currently sits on their Holding Board.  

He received the “Outstanding College Alumnus Award” from UNLV in 2002.

From 1993 to 1995, he was president of the Laughlin Chamber of Commerce.  In 1991, he chaired the Nevada Hotel/Motel Association.  In February 1997, he was named a member of the Nevada Governor's Council on Tourism.  He was a member of the Board of Directors and Vice Chairperson of the Executive Committee for United Way of Southern Nevada. He also served on the Las Vegas Convention and Visitors Authority Board of Directors.

He previously served as a Board Member for the University of Nevada Las Vegas Foundation, the Andre Agassi Foundation, and the Las Vegas Convention and Visitors Authority. He currently is a member of the Board of Trustees for Three Square.

References

Living people
American casino industry businesspeople
American chairpersons of corporations
American corporate directors
American chief executives of travel and tourism industry companies
William F. Harrah College of Hotel Administration alumni
American chief operating officers
Year of birth missing (living people)
MGM Resorts International